Barbara Sass-Zdort (14 October 1936 – 2 April 2015) was a Polish screenwriter and film/stage director. In 1975, she graduated from the National Film School in Łódź. She was married to the cinematographer Wiesław Zdort. Mother of famous Polish lawyer Pawel Zdort (Weil, Gotshal & Manges LPP, and Rymarz Zdort) and journalist Dominik Zdort.(TVP).

Awards
She received numerous awards, including FIPRESCI Prize (1980,1996), Prize for Best Debut Director at the Polish Film Festival (1980), and the Krzysztof Kieślowski Beyond Borders Award for Best Feature at the New York Polish Film Festival (2012).
Nominated for Crystal Globe for Temptation (Pokuszene) at the Karlovy Vary International Film Festival in 1996.

Selected filmography
 1980 – Bez miłości (Without Love)
 1981 – Debiutantka (Debutante)
 1982 – Krzyk (Scream)
 1993 – Pajęczarki (Spider Women)
 1995 – Pokuszenie (Temptation)
 1999 – Jak narkotyk (Like a Drug)
 2011 – W imieniu diabła (In the Name of the Devil)

References

External links
 
 Barbara Sass profile at the Polish Film Academy

1936 births
2015 deaths
Polish women film directors
Polish screenwriters
Polish film directors
Polish women screenwriters